Yermolay is a Russian given name.  It is also written as Ermolai, Ermolay, and Yermolai.

Derivation
Yermolay is derived from the Greek Hermolaos, meaning "the people of Hermes".

It is the basis of the surnames Yermolayev  and Yermoshin.

Notable Yermolays
People with the given name Yermolay include:
 Ermolai-Erazm, 16th-century Russian churchman
 Yermolay Yermolayevich Hamper (Gamper), 1750–1814, Russian major general of the Napoleonic Wars
 Yermolay Dementievich Kamezhenkov, 1760–1818, Russian artist
 Yermolay Fyodorovich Kern, 1773–1841, Russian general of the Napoleonic Wars
 Yermolai Aleksandrovich Solzhenitsyn, born 1970, son of Aleksandr Solzhenitsyn and translator/annotator of his works

Fictional Yermolays
 Yermolay Alekseyevich Lopakhin, a character in The Cherry Orchard by Anton Chekhov
 "Yermolay and the Miller's Wife", a story from Ivan Turgenev's A Sportsman's Sketches
 Yermolay, a character in the 1979 Soviet film Siberiade.

References

Russian masculine given names